The governor of the Northern Province of Sri Lanka is the head of the provincial government and exercises executive power over subjects devolved to the Northern Provincial Council. The current governor is Jeevan Thiagarajah.

Governors

References

External links
Northern Provincial Council

 
Northern